The Maritimes consist of the provinces of New Brunswick, Nova Scotia and Prince Edward Island. Some of the cuisine has its origins in the foods of the indigenous peoples of the region.

Unique dishes or recipes
One unique Acadian dish is poutine râpée, a potato dumpling that is usually stuffed with salted pork and simmered for three or four hours. Usually served as a main course, it is also often served as a desert with brown sugar or molasses or another sweetener. Rapée/rapie pie is an Acadian poultry dish. Seafood is of great importance in the Maritimes and it is prepared in many ways. Lobster rolls are commonly found throughout the province of New Brunswick, and are a dish typical of the locals; these can be found in the United States as well, particularly in Maine, which adjoins the Province of New Brunswick, the only province with two official languages, French and English. This is an indication of the culture found in New Brunswick, the province between Quebec and Nova Scotia.

Another common food among Maritimers is dulse; dulse is seaweed of a certain type and grows along the New Brunswick and Nova Scotia coasts. Some Maritimers eat dried dulse, a reddish-purple-to-black salty-tasting snack, eaten similarly to potato chips. The popular dulse, lettuce and tomato (DLT) sandwich is a dish found at the historic Saint John City Market.

Potatoes, being a mainstay crop in New Brunswick and Prince Edward Island, are also a staple in Maritime cuisine. Hash brown casserole made with potato, cheese and cream dish and potato pancakes similar to Irish boxty are very popular breakfast dishes.

Maple sugar, in many forms, from maple syrup (sirop d'érable) to maple-leaf-shaped crunchy candies, is an important sweet in Eastern Canada, where sugaring-off excursions (involving 'tire d'érable sur la neige,' when the hot syrup is poured onto snow to crystallize) are one of the better winter activities. It is also an important export economically.

Cow's Ice Cream is an artisan ice cream company from Prince Edward Island, with locations in Halifax, Nova Scotia and Quebec City.

Wild blueberries grow in abundance in the Maritimes and are commonly picked, although they are quite small compared to commercially available blueberries. They can be made into the Acadian dumpling dessert called blueberry grunt, among others. Seal flippers and seal flipper pie, various bean dishes, usually flavored with pork, any fish are also commonly eaten dishes in the Maratimes.

In Nova Scotia, a dish known as hodge podge or hodegy podegy is widely eaten in the Annapolis Valley. This dish is a stew or soup containing fresh vegetables such as small baby potatoes or new potatoes, fresh peas, green beans and wax beans and carrots. These vegetables are cooked in a milk broth that contains butter, pepper and salt. Commonly, this dish is accompanied by corned beef either from a can or prepared separately from the dish. Hodge podge is generally consumed during July and August when these vegetables are in season.

Another food item specific to the Maritimes is Moon Mist ice cream, a combination of banana, grape, and bubblegum ice cream exclusive to the region.

Back in the first decade of the twentieth century, the wife of the Thomas Ashburnham, 6th Earl of Ashburnham was a well known high-society patron in Fredericton, and her homemade mustard pickle recipe became a regional delicacy. The homemade mustard pickles, sometimes referred to as "Lady Ashburnham", "Lady Ashburn", or "Lady A" pickles (in honour of the creator) are sold at locally owned supermarkets and local events like farmer's markets, and are typically eaten at Thanksgiving and/or Christmas dinners.
	
Other staples of Maritime cuisine include meat pie and donair.

Restaurants and pubs
Many restaurants and pubs in the area offer dishes such as corned beef and cabbage, bacon and cabbage, bangers and mash, and fish and chips, as well as Newfoundland specialties such as Jiggs dinner.

There are many small craft breweries in the Maritimes as well as the flagship Maritime breweries of Nova Scotia's Alexander Keith's.

See also 

 Acadian cuisine
 Maritimes
 Local food

References

Categories 
 Food and drink
 Snack foods

 Maritimes
Culture of the Maritimes

Cuisine of New Brunswick
Cuisine of Nova Scotia
Cuisine of Prince Edward Island